The men's 200 metres at the 2011 Asian Athletics Championships was held at the Kobe Universiade Memorial Stadium on 9 and 10 July.

Medalists

Records

Results

Round 1
First 2 in each heat (Q) and 2 best performers (q) advanced to the Final.

Final

References

200 metres
200 metres at the Asian Athletics Championships